Richard Bowers may refer to:

Richard Bowers (cricketer) (born 1976), English cricketer
Dick Bowers (Richard T. Bowers, 1930–2007), American college athletics administrator
Richard Bowers, US soldier who first sang "Gomen-nasai", and also featured in Mission Over Korea 1953
Richard Bowers, composer for TV and films Candles in the Dark, She's No Angel, Dead at 17
Richard Bowers, co-founder of Zero Population Growth with Charles Lee Remington and Paul R. Ehrlich

See also
 Richard Plant Bower (1905–1996), Canadian diplomat
 Richard Bower (d.1561), Royal choirmaster of the Tudor period